Phyllis Monkman (8 January 1892 – 2 December 1976) was a British stage and film actress. She was married to the entertainer Laddie Cliff.

In the early years of her career, she was often partnered on stage by Jack Buchanan and appeared in the silent film Her Heritage with him in 1919. She was also prominent in the cast of the revue The Co-Optimists and reprised her role in the film adaptation. After this point she was increasingly confined to supporting character parts. She was romantically linked to George VI.

Selected filmography
 Her Heritage (1919)
 Blackmail (1929)
 The Co-Optimists (1929)
 The King of Paris (1934)
 Young Man's Fancy (1939)
 The Good Old Days (1940)
 Carnival (1946)
 Diamond City (1949)

References

Bibliography
 James Ross Moore. Andre Charlot: The Genius of Intimate Musical Revue. McFarland, 2005.

External links

1892 births
1976 deaths
British film actresses
British stage actresses
Actresses from London